The following is a list of women's international rugby union matches and tournaments.

For a list of games involving advertised "A" teams and other games of doubtful international status, see the related article Women's international rugby union (non test matches).

Overall
(Full internationals only, updated to 27 November 2022)

1982

Tournaments
None

Other matches

1983

Tournaments
None

Other matches

1984

Tournaments
None

Other matches

1985

Tournaments
None

Other matches

1986

Tournaments
None

Other matches

1987

Tournaments
None

Other matches

1988

Tournaments

Other matches

1989

Tournaments
None

Other matches

1990

Tournaments

Other matches

1991

Tournaments

Other matches

1992

Tournaments
None

Other matches

1993

Tournaments

Other matches

1994

Tournaments

Other matches

1995

Tournaments

Other matches

1996

Tournaments

Other matches

1997

Tournaments

Other matches

1998

Tournaments

Other matches

1999

Tournaments

Other matches

2000

Tournaments

Other matches

2001

Tournaments

Other matches

2002

Tournaments

Other matches

2003

Tournaments

Other matches

2004

Tournaments

Other matches

2005

Tournaments

Other matches

2006

Tournaments

Other matches

2007

Tournaments

Other matches

2008

Tournaments

Other matches

2009

Tournaments

Other matches

2010

Tournaments

Other matches

2011

Tournaments

Other matches

2012

Tournaments

Other matches

2013

Tournaments

Other matches

2014

Tournaments

Other matches

2015

Tournaments

Other matches

2016

Tournaments

Other matches

2017

Tournaments

Other matches

2018

Tournaments

Other matches

2019

Tournaments

Other matches

2020

Tournaments

Other matches

2021

Tournaments

Other matches

2022

Tournaments

Other matches

2023

Tournaments

Other matches

Notes

References

External links
 
Rugbydata includes women's internationals (18 March 2010 to 16 March 2014)
Entire list of internationals (13 June 1982 to 28 April 2012) in a Google Documents spreadsheet.
The rise and popularity of women's rugby in Canada, by John A O'Hanley (1998)
Official women's World Rankings